4'-Fluoro-α-pyrrolidinopentiophenone (also known as O-2370, FPVP and 4-Fluoro-α-PVP) is a stimulant drug of the cathinone class which has been reported as a novel designer drug.

Legality
4-F-α-PVP is illegal in China, Hungary, and Japan.

See also 
 3F-PVP
 4-Fluoro-α-POP
 4Cl-PVP
 4-Et-PVP
 4F-PHP
 4F-POP
 α-PBP
 α-PHP
 α-PPP
 α-PVP
 MFPVP
 MOPVP
 DMPVP
 MDPV
 Prolintane

References 

Designer drugs
Fluoroarenes
Pyrrolidinophenones
Norepinephrine–dopamine reuptake inhibitors
Stimulants
Propyl compounds